The Monument to the Victims of the Holocaust is a monument in Madrid, Spain, in memory of the victims of the Holocaust during World War II. It is located in the Three Cultures Garden in Juan Carlos I Park, Madrid, Spain. At the time of its inauguration in 2007, the monument was the first Holocaust memorial in Spain.

History
On December 15, 2004, Spain established January 27 as the Day for the Remembrance of the Holocaust and the Prevention of Crimes after a United Nations resolution instituted International Holocaust Remembrance Day. In 2005, Spanish Prime Minister José Luis Zapatero visited the Mauthausen concentration camp on the 60th anniversary of its liberation. Mauthausen held thousands of Spanish political prisoners who opposed the Franco regime. Zapatero was the first prime minister to visit a concentration camp.

On April 28, 2005, the Madrid City Council unanimously approved the establishment of a Holocaust memorial. Per an agreement between the Madrid City Council and the Jewish community of Madrid (CJM), the Jewish community bore the 53,600 euro construction cost as a donation to the city.

It was dedicated by Mayor of Madrid Alberto Ruiz-Gallardón on March 12, 2007. At the time of its inauguration, the monument was the first Holocaust memorial in Spain. In 2017, the northwest town of Oviedo became the second city in Spain with a Holocaust memorial.

Description
The monument is placed in the Three Cultures Garden in Madrid's Juan Carlos I Park. The garden symbolizes the coexistence of Christians, Muslims, and Jews.

Forty-four columns of steel and wooden railroad ties form a Star of David, with the center column situated on a platform and standing 10 meters high. The railroad ties are nailed upright, directly into the ground, to simulate tombstones in a cemetery.

On one side of the platform is a sculpture made of wooden railroad ties of a father holding his son in his arms. On a pathway leading to the platform is a commemorative bronze plaque with the following inscription:

See also
 List of Holocaust memorials and museums

References

Holocaust memorials
Buildings and structures in the Community of Madrid
Monuments and memorials in the Community of Madrid
2007 establishments in Spain
Jews and Judaism in Spain